Then Kinnam is a 1971 Indian Tamil-language romantic comedy film, directed and produced by K. Krishnamoorthy. Music was by Shankar–Ganesh. It stars Nagesh, Vijaya Lalitha, V. K. Ramasamy and M. R. R. Vasu, with Suruli Rajan, Sachu, Thengai Srinivasan, and Vijayachandrika in supporting roles. It was released on 11 December 1971.

Plot

Cast 
 Nagesh as Mohan
 Vijaya Lalitha as Mala
 Suruli Rajan as Manikkam
 V. K. Ramasamy as Kangasabai
 M. R. R. Vasu as Accountant
 S. N. Lakshmi as  Meenakshi
 Thengai Srinivasan as Chithambaram
 Sachu as Rama Sundari
 Rama Rao as Jayaram
 Vijaya Chandrika as Bhanu

Soundtrack 
Music was composed by Shankar–Ganesh and lyrics were written by Kumara Devan. The songs "Thenkinnam Thenkinnam" and "Utharavindri Ulley Vaa" attained popularity.

References

External links 
 

1971 romantic comedy films
1970s Tamil-language films
1971 films
Films scored by Shankar–Ganesh
Indian black-and-white films
Indian romantic comedy films